Sri Ramanjaneya Yuddha is a 1963 Indian Kannada-language film, directed by M. Nageshwara Rao and M S Nayak. The film stars Rajkumar, Udaykumar, K. S. Ashwath and Dikki Madhavarao. The film has musical score by Chellapilla Satyam who made his debut through this film. The title card of the movie revealed that this was Rajkumar's 50th movie. The movie was remade in Telugu in 1975 as Sri Ramanjaneya Yuddham starring N. T. Rama Rao.

Cast

Dr. Rajkumar
Udaykumar
K. S. Ashwath
Dikki Madhava Rao
B. Raghavendra Rao
H. R. Shastry
Pandari Bai
Advani Lakshmi Devi
Jayanthi
M. Jayashree
Baby Amruthakala
Baby Padmini
Rajendra Krishna
Suryakumar
Vidyasagar
Narasimhaiah
Shivaji Rao
Srikantaswamy
Sando Krishna
Master Gopal
Kumari Chandrakala
Kumari Usha

Soundtrack
The music was composed by Chellapilla Satyam.

References

External links
 
 

1960s Kannada-language films
Films scored by Satyam (composer)
Films based on the Ramayana
Kannada films remade in other languages